James Rush Lofland (November 2, 1823 – February 10, 1894) was an American lawyer and politician from Milford, in Kent County, Delaware. He was a member of the Republican Party, who served as U. S. Representative from Delaware.

Early life and family
Born in Milford, Delaware, he received a classical education and was graduated from Delaware College at Newark, Delaware in 1845. He studied law, and was admitted to the Delaware Bar in 1848, commencing his practice in Milford.

Professional and political career
In 1849 he was secretary of the Delaware Senate and was a member of the State constitutional convention in 1853. He was Secretary of State of Delaware from 1855 to 1859, and a paymaster in the United States Army from 1863 to 1867. During the 1872 presidential election he was a delegate to the Republican National Convention.

Lofland was elected as a Republican to the 43rd Congress, serving from March 4, 1873 to March 3, 1875. He was an unsuccessful candidate for reelection in 1874 to the 44th Congress, and resumed the practice of law.

Death and legacy
Lofland died at Milford and is buried there in the Odd Fellows Cemetery.

Almanac
Elections were held the first Tuesday after November 1. U.S. Representatives took office March 4.

References

External links
Biographical Directory of the United States Congress 
Delaware’s Members of Congress 
The Political Graveyard

Places with more information
Delaware Historical Society; website; 505 North Market Street, Wilmington, Delaware 19801; (302) 655-7161
University of Delaware; Library website; 181 South College Avenue, Newark, Delaware 19717; (302) 831-2965
Newark Free Library; 750 Library Ave., Newark, Delaware; (302) 731-7550

1823 births
1894 deaths
University of Delaware alumni
People from Milford, Delaware
United States Army paymasters
Secretaries of State of Delaware
Burials in Kent County, Delaware
Delaware lawyers
Republican Party members of the United States House of Representatives from Delaware
19th-century American politicians
19th-century American lawyers